Herman Peters (1899-1989) was an Australian rugby league footballer who played in the 1910s and 1920s. He was educated at North Sydney Boys High School. An international representative , he played his club football with North Sydney in the NSWRFL premiership and won two premierships with the club.

Playing career
Peters played eight games of the 1921 NSWRFL season in which the North Sydney team won the premiership without having to play a final. As part of Norths' champion backline, he gained selection on the 1921–22 Kangaroo tour of Great Britain, along with clubmates, Blinkhorn, Rule, Horder, Ives and Thompson. He went on to play in the 1922 NSWRFL season's Premiership Final for Norths, scoring a try to help them claim consecutive premierships. In the 1923 NSWRFL season, Peters was the premiership season's top try-scorer. He scored 16 tries in 18 games.

Post playing
Peters coached North Sydney in the 1934 NSWRFL season. He later went on to be a National Selector for the ARL. He was known as "The Grand Old Man" of the North Sydney Bears club and was a staunch supporter right up to his death in 1989.  Before his death in 1989, Peters was quoted as saying "Hoping for Norths to win another one has kept me going I've watched them all the years since 1922, and I want to be there on the day it happens".

References

1899 births
1989 deaths
Australia national rugby league team players
Australian rugby league coaches
Australian rugby league players
New South Wales rugby league team players
North Sydney Bears coaches
North Sydney Bears players
People educated at North Sydney Boys High School
Rugby league centres
Rugby league players from Sydney
Sportsmen from New South Wales